Matthew Levin (born 1952) is a Canadian diplomat and trade representative. He served as ambassador of Canada to Colombia from 2005 to 2008, to Cuba from 2010 to 2013 and to Spain from 2016.

See also
 Canada–Cuba relations
 Canada–Colombia relations

External links
 Embassy of Canada in Cuba

References

Living people
Ambassadors of Canada to Cuba
Ambassadors of Canada to Colombia
University of Manitoba alumni
Academic staff of the University of Milan
1952 births